Red Rock is a small hamlet in the northern beaches of the Coffs Harbour coast beside the banks of the Corindi River on the Mid North Coast of New South Wales, Australia, and is surrounded by National Parks. It is in the City of Coffs Harbour local government area. The small Red Rock River passes near the town.

Tourism 
Red Rock is primarily a holiday village. Most of the residencies remain vacant throughout majority of the year - except during the school holidays, where you will need to book though the camping ground typically years in advance to secure a site. There is a lifesaving club, community centre, bowling club, a general store and caravan park located within the village.

The area has lovely beaches and the river is also good for swimming, kayaking and snorkeling.  The southern beach can be dangerous and isn't recommended for children, but it provides excellent fishing and great shorebreak barrels which have been mastered by the local bodyboard surfers. It is easy to cross the estuary and explore the National Park to the north.

History 
Within the traditional Gumbaynggirr tribal area, Red Rock was first colonised in the 19th century when farmers established themselves at what is now Corindi Beach.

The headland is the site of an alleged massacre of the Gumbaynngir indigenous people in the mid 19th century. A memorial has been erected at the base of the headland to commemorate this. The alleged massacre began at Blackadders Creek when mounted police allegedly entered a campsite.  They allegedly started shooting and then allegedly pursued the survivors to the Corindi River where they allegedly continued shooting. Some people were allegedly driven off the headland. The headland is named Red Rock because the rocks contain the rock jasper, an opaque silica.

Notes and references

http://ozgeotours.yolasite.com/red-rock.php

Towns in New South Wales
Northern Rivers
City of Coffs Harbour